KF Memaliaj is an Albanian football club based in the small town of Memaliaj. KF Memaliaj is currently in the Kategoria e Dytë. They play their games at the "Karafil Çaushi" Stadium.

Current squad

 (Captain)

Achievements
 Kampion i Kategorisë së Dytë 2008

External links
Second Division Standings and Stats
FutbolliShqiptar.net 
Albanian Soccer News 
Albania Sport

 
Memaliaj
1947 establishments in Albania
Memaliaj
Association football clubs established in 1947
Kategoria e Dytë clubs